Bung Khla is a district (amphoe) of Bueng Kan province, northeastern Thailand.

History
The minor district (king amphoe) was split off from Bueng Kan district on 1 April 1991. It was upgraded to a full district on 5 December 1996.

Geography
Neighboring districts are (from the south clockwise) Bueng Khong Long, Seka, and Mueang Bueng Kan of Bueng Kan Province. To the east across the Mekong river is the Laotian province Bolikhamxai.

The Phu Wua Wildlife Sanctuary is in the district.

Administration
The district is divided into three sub-districts (tambons), which are further subdivided into 25 villages (mubans). There are no municipal (thesaban) areas, and three tambon administrative organizations (TAO).

Economy
The district's location on a bank of the Mekong has made it a prime agricultural area. Tomatoes, in particular, are one of the more profitable crops.

References

External links
amphoe.com

 
Districts of Bueng Kan province
Populated places on the Mekong River